Yellowstone National Park is an American national park located in the western United States, largely in the northwest corner of Wyoming and extending into Montana and Idaho. It was established by the 42nd U.S. Congress with the Yellowstone National Park Protection Act and signed into law by President Ulysses S. Grant on March 1, 1872. Yellowstone was the first national park in the U.S. and is also widely held to be the first national park in the world. The park is known for its wildlife and its many geothermal features, especially the Old Faithful geyser, one of its most popular. While it represents many types of biomes, the subalpine forest is the most abundant. It is part of the South Central Rockies forests ecoregion.

While Native Americans have lived in the Yellowstone region for at least 11,000 years, aside from visits by mountain men during the early-to-mid-19th century, organized exploration did not begin until the late 1860s. Management and control of the park originally fell under the jurisdiction of the U.S. Department of the Interior, the first Secretary of the Interior to supervise the park being Columbus Delano. However, the U.S. Army was eventually commissioned to oversee the management of Yellowstone for 30 years between 1886 and 1916. In 1917, administration of the park was transferred to the National Park Service, which had been created the previous year. Hundreds of structures have been built and are protected for their architectural and historical significance, and researchers have examined more than a thousand archaeological sites.

Yellowstone Lake is one of the largest high-elevation lakes in North America and is centered over the Yellowstone Caldera, the largest supervolcano on the continent. The caldera is considered a dormant volcano. It has erupted with tremendous force several times in the last two million years. Well over half of the world's geysers and hydrothermal features are in Yellowstone, fueled by this ongoing volcanism. Lava flows and rocks from volcanic eruptions cover most of the land area of Yellowstone. The park is the centerpiece of the Greater Yellowstone Ecosystem, the largest remaining nearly-intact ecosystem in the Earth's northern temperate zone. In 1978, Yellowstone was named a UNESCO World Heritage Site.

Hundreds of species of mammals, birds, fish, reptiles, and amphibians have been documented, including several that are either endangered or threatened. The vast forests and grasslands also include unique species of plants. Yellowstone Park is the largest, and most famous megafauna location in the contiguous United States. Grizzly bears, cougars, wolves, and free-ranging herds of bison and elk live in this park. The Yellowstone Park bison herd is the oldest and largest public bison herd in the United States. Forest fires occur in the park each year; in the large forest fires of 1988, nearly one-third of the park was burnt. Yellowstone has numerous recreational opportunities, including hiking, camping, boating, fishing, and sightseeing. Paved roads provide close access to the major geothermal areas as well as some of the lakes and waterfalls. During the winter, visitors often access the park by way of guided tours that use either snow coaches or snowmobiles.

History 
The park contains the headwaters of the Yellowstone River, from which it takes its historical name. Near the end of the 18th century, French trappers named the river , which is probably a translation of the Hidatsa name  ("Yellow Stone River"). Later, American trappers rendered the French name in English as "Yellow Stone". Although it is commonly believed that the river was named for the yellow rocks seen in the Grand Canyon of the Yellowstone, the Native American name source is unclear.

The human history of the park began at least 11,000 years ago when Native Americans began to hunt and fish in the region. During the construction of the post office in Gardiner, Montana, in the 1950s, an obsidian point of Clovis origin was found that dated from approximately 11,000 years ago. These Paleo-Indians, of the Clovis culture, used the significant amounts of obsidian found in the park to make cutting tools and weapons. Arrowheads made of Yellowstone obsidian have been found as far away as the Mississippi Valley, indicating that a regular obsidian trade existed between local tribes and tribes farther east. When the Lewis and Clark Expedition entered present-day Montana in 1805 they encountered the Nez Perce, Crow, and Shoshone tribes who described to them the Yellowstone region to the south, but they chose not to investigate.

In 1806, John Colter, a member of the Lewis and Clark Expedition, left to join a group of fur trappers. After splitting up with the other trappers in 1807, Colter passed through a portion of what later became the park, during the winter of 1807–1808. He observed at least one geothermal area in the northeastern section of the park, near Tower Fall. After surviving wounds he suffered in a battle with members of the Crow and Blackfoot tribes in 1809, Colter described a place of "fire and brimstone" that most people dismissed as delirium; the supposedly mystical place was nicknamed "Colter's Hell". Over the next 40 years, numerous reports from mountain men and trappers told of boiling mud, steaming rivers, and petrified trees, yet most of these reports were believed at the time to be a myth.

After an 1856 exploration, mountain man Jim Bridger (also believed to be the first or second European American to have seen the Great Salt Lake) reported observing boiling springs, spouting water, and a mountain of glass and yellow rock. These reports were largely ignored because Bridger was a known "spinner of yarns". In 1859, a U.S. Army Surveyor named Captain William F. Raynolds embarked on a two-year survey of the southern central Rockies. After wintering in Wyoming, in May 1860, Raynolds and his party—which included geologist Ferdinand V. Hayden and guide Jim Bridger—attempted to cross the Continental Divide over Two Ocean Plateau from the Wind River drainage in northwest Wyoming. Heavy spring snows prevented their passage but had they been able to traverse the divide, the party would have been the first organized survey to enter the Yellowstone region. The American Civil War hampered further organized explorations until the late 1860s.

The first detailed expedition to the Yellowstone area was the Cook–Folsom–Peterson Expedition of 1869, which consisted of three privately funded explorers. The Folsom party followed the Yellowstone River to Yellowstone Lake. The members of the Folsom party kept a journal and based on the information it reported, a party of Montana residents organized the Washburn–Langford–Doane Expedition in 1870. It was headed by the surveyor-general of Montana Henry Washburn, and included Nathaniel P. Langford (who later became known as "National Park" Langford) and a U.S. Army detachment commanded by Lt. Gustavus Doane. The expedition spent about a month exploring the region, collecting specimens, and naming sites of interest.

A Montana writer and lawyer named Cornelius Hedges, who had been a member of the Washburn expedition, proposed that the region should be set aside and protected as a national park; he wrote detailed articles about his observations for the Helena Herald newspaper between 1870 and 1871. Hedges essentially restated comments made in October 1865 by acting Montana Territorial Governor Thomas Francis Meagher, who had previously commented that the region should be protected. Others made similar suggestions. An 1871 letter to Ferdinand V. Hayden from Jay Cooke, a businessman who wanted to bring tourists to the region, encouraged him to mention it in his official report of the survey. Cooke wrote that his friend, Congressman William D. Kelley had also suggested "Congress pass a bill reserving the Great Geyser Basin as a public park forever".

Park creation 

In 1871, eleven years after his failed first effort, Ferdinand V. Hayden was finally able to explore the region. With government sponsorship, he returned to the region with a second, larger expedition, the Hayden Geological Survey of 1871. He compiled a comprehensive report, including large-format photographs by William Henry Jackson and paintings by Thomas Moran. The report helped to convince the U.S. Congress to withdraw this region from public auction. On March 1, 1872, President Ulysses S. Grant signed The Act of Dedication law that created Yellowstone National Park.

Hayden, while not the only person to have thought of creating a park in the region, was its first and most enthusiastic advocate. He believed in "setting aside the area as a pleasure ground for the benefit and enjoyment of the people" and warned that there were those who would come and "make merchandise of these beautiful specimens". Worrying the area could face the same fate as Niagara Falls, he concluded the site should "be as free as the air or Water." In his report to the Committee on Public Lands, he concluded that if the bill failed to become law, "the vandals who are now waiting to enter into this wonder-land, will in a single season despoil, beyond recovery, these remarkable curiosities, which have required all the cunning skill of nature thousands of years to prepare".

Hayden and his 1871 party recognized Yellowstone as a unique place that should be available for further research. He also was encouraged to preserve it for others to see and experience it as well. In 1873, Congress authorized and funded a survey to find a wagon route to the park from the south which was completed by the Jones Expedition of 1873. Eventually the railroads and, sometime after that, the automobile would make that possible. The park was not set aside strictly for ecological purposes; however, the designation "pleasure ground" was not an invitation to create an amusement park. Hayden imagined something akin to the scenic resorts and baths in England, Germany, and Switzerland.

There was considerable local opposition to Yellowstone National Park during its early years. Some of the locals feared that the regional economy would be unable to thrive if there remained strict federal prohibitions against resource development or settlement within park boundaries and local entrepreneurs advocated reducing the size of the park so that mining, hunting, and logging activities could be developed. To this end, numerous bills were introduced into Congress by Montana representatives who sought to remove the federal land-use restrictions.

After the park's official formation, Nathaniel Langford was appointed as the park's first superintendent in 1872 by the Secretary of Interior Columbus Delano, the first overseer and controller of the park. Langford served for five years but was denied a salary, funding, and staff. Langford lacked the means to improve the land or properly protect the park, and without formal policy or regulations, he had few legal methods to enforce such protection. This left Yellowstone vulnerable to poachers, vandals, and others seeking to raid its resources. He addressed the practical problems park administrators faced in the 1872 Report to the Secretary of the Interior and correctly predicted that Yellowstone would become a major international attraction deserving the continuing stewardship of the government. In 1874, both Langford and Delano advocated the creation of a federal agency to protect the vast park, but Congress refused. In 1875, Colonel William Ludlow, who had previously explored areas of Montana under the command of George Armstrong Custer, was assigned to organize and lead an expedition to Montana and the newly established Yellowstone Park. Observations about the lawlessness and exploitation of park resources were included in Ludlow's Report of a Reconnaissance to the Yellowstone National Park. The report included letters and attachments by other expedition members, including naturalist and mineralogist George Bird Grinnell.

Grinnell documented the poaching of buffalo, deer, elk, and antelope for hides. "It is estimated that during the winter of 1874–1875, not less than 3,000 buffalo and mule deer suffer even more severely than the elk, and the antelope nearly as much."

As a result, Langford was forced to step down in 1877.
Having traveled through Yellowstone and witnessed land management problems, Philetus Norris volunteered for the position following Langford's exit. Congress finally saw fit to implement a salary for the position, as well as to provide minimal funding to operate the park. Norris used these funds to expand access to the park, building numerous crude roads and facilities.

In 1880, Harry Yount was appointed as a gamekeeper to control poaching and vandalism in the park. Yount had previously spent decades exploring the mountain country of present-day Wyoming, including the Grand Tetons, after joining F V. Hayden's Geological Survey in 1873. Yount is the first national park ranger, and Yount's Peak, at the head of the Yellowstone River, was named in his honor. However, these measures still proved to be insufficient in protecting the park, as neither Norris nor the three superintendents who followed, were given sufficient manpower or resources.

The Northern Pacific Railroad built a train station in Livingston, Montana, connecting to the northern entrance in the early 1880s, which helped to increase visitation from 300 in 1872 to 5,000 in 1883. A line was also extended from Livingston to Gardiner station, where passengers switched to stagecoach. Visitors in these early years faced poor roads and limited services, and most access into the park was on horse or via stagecoach. By 1908 visitation increased enough to attract a Union Pacific Railroad connection to West Yellowstone, though rail visitation fell off considerably by World War II and ceased around the 1960s.

During the 1870s and 1880s, Native American tribes were effectively excluded from the national park. Under a half-dozen tribes had made seasonal use of the Yellowstone area- the only year-round residents were small bands of Eastern Shoshone known as "Sheepeaters". They left the area under the assurances of a treaty negotiated in 1868, under which the Sheepeaters ceded their lands but retained the right to hunt in Yellowstone. The United States never ratified the treaty and refused to recognize the claims of the Sheepeaters or any other tribe that had used Yellowstone.

The Nez Perce band associated with Chief Joseph, numbering about 750 people, passed through Yellowstone National Park in thirteen days in late August 1877. They were being pursued by the U.S. Army and entered the national park about two weeks after the Battle of the Big Hole. Some of the Nez Perce were friendly to the tourists and other people they encountered in the park; some were not. Nine park visitors were briefly taken captive. Despite Joseph and other chiefs ordering that no one should be harmed, at least two people were killed and several wounded. One of the areas where encounters occurred was in Lower Geyser Basin and east along a branch of the Firehole River to Mary Mountain and beyond. That stream is still known as Nez Perce Creek. A group of Bannocks entered the park in 1878, alarming park Superintendent Philetus Norris. In the aftermath of the Sheepeater Indian War of 1879, Norris built a fort to prevent Native Americans from entering the national park.

Ongoing poaching and destruction of natural resources continued unabated until the U.S. Army arrived at Mammoth Hot Springs in 1886 and built Camp Sheridan. Over the next 22 years, as the army constructed permanent structures, Camp Sheridan was renamed Fort Yellowstone. On May 7, 1894, the Boone and Crockett Club, acting through the personality of George G. Vest, Arnold Hague, William Hallett Phillips, W. A. Wadsworth, Archibald Rogers, Theodore Roosevelt, and George Bird Grinnell were successful in carrying through the Park Protection Act, which saved the park. The Lacey Act of 1900 provided legal support for the officials prosecuting poachers. With the funding and manpower necessary to keep a diligent watch, the army developed its own policies and regulations that permitted public access while protecting park wildlife and natural resources. When the National Park Service was created in 1916, many of the management principles developed by the army were adopted by the new agency. The army turned control over to the National Park Service on October 31, 1918.

In 1898, the naturalist John Muir described the park as follows: "However orderly your excursions or aimless, again and again amid the calmest, stillest scenery you will be brought to a standstill hushed and awe-stricken before phenomena wholly new to you. Boiling springs and huge deep pools of purest green and azure water, thousands of them, are plashing and heaving in these high, cool mountains as if a fierce furnace fire were burning beneath each one of them; and a hundred geysers, white torrents of boiling water and steam, like inverted waterfalls, are ever and anon rushing up out of the hot, black underworld."

Later history 

By 1915, 1,000 automobiles per year were entering the park, resulting in conflicts with horses and horse-drawn transportation. Horse travel on roads was eventually prohibited.

The Civilian Conservation Corps (CCC), a New Deal relief agency for young men, played a major role between 1933 and 1942 in developing Yellowstone facilities. CCC projects included reforestation, campground development of many of the park's trails and campgrounds, trail construction, fire hazard reduction, and fire-fighting work. The CCC built the majority of the early visitor centers, campgrounds, and the current system of park roads.

During World War II, tourist travel fell sharply, staffing was cut, and many facilities fell into disrepair. By the 1950s, visitation increased tremendously in Yellowstone and other national parks. To accommodate the increased visitation, park officials implemented Mission 66, an effort to modernize and expand park service facilities. Planned to be completed by 1966, in honor of the 50th anniversary of the founding of the National Park Service, Mission 66 construction diverged from the traditional log cabin style with design features of a modern style. During the late 1980s, most construction styles in Yellowstone reverted to the more traditional designs. After the enormous forest fires of 1988 damaged much of Grant Village, structures there were rebuilt in the traditional style. The visitor center at Canyon Village, which opened in 2006, incorporates a more traditional design as well.

The 1959 Hebgen Lake earthquake just west of Yellowstone at Hebgen Lake damaged roads and some structures in the park. In the northwest section of the park, new geysers were found, and many existing hot springs became turbid. It was the most powerful earthquake to hit the region in recorded history.

In 1963, after several years of public controversy regarding the forced reduction of the elk population in Yellowstone, the United States Secretary of the Interior Stewart Udall appointed an advisory board to collect scientific data to inform future wildlife management of the national parks. In a paper known as the Leopold Report, the committee observed that culling programs at other national parks had been ineffective, and recommended the management of Yellowstone's elk population.

The wildfires during the summer of 1988 were the largest in the history of the park. Approximately  or 36% of the parkland was impacted by the fires, leading to a systematic re-evaluation of fire management policies. The fire season of 1988 was considered normal until a combination of drought and heat by mid-July contributed to an extreme fire danger. On "Black Saturday", August 20, 1988, strong winds expanded the fires rapidly, and more than  burned.

The expansive cultural history of the park has been documented by the 1,000 archeological sites that have been discovered. The park has 1,106 historic structures and features, and of these Obsidian Cliff and five buildings have been designated National Historic Landmarks. Yellowstone was designated an International Biosphere Reserve on October 26, 1976, and a UN World Heritage Site on September 8, 1978. The park was placed on the List of World Heritage in Danger from 1995 to 2003 due to the effects of tourism, infection of wildlife, and issues with invasive species. In 2010, Yellowstone National Park was honored with its own quarter under the America the Beautiful Quarters Program.

Justin Farrell explores three moral sensibilities that motivated activists in dealing with Yellowstone. First came the utilitarian vision of maximum exploitation of natural resources, a characteristic of developers in the late 19th century. Second was the spiritual vision of nature inspired by Romanticism and the transcendentalists in the mid-19th century. The twentieth century saw the biocentric moral vision that focuses on the health of the ecosystem as theorized by Aldo Leopold, which led to the expansion of federally protected areas and the surrounding ecosystems.

Heritage and Research Center 
The Heritage and Research Center is located at Gardiner, Montana, near the north entrance to the park. The center is home to the Yellowstone National Park's museum collection, archives, research library, historian, archeology lab, and herbarium. The Yellowstone National Park Archives maintain collections of historical records of Yellowstone and the National Park Service. The collection includes the administrative records of Yellowstone, as well as resource management records, records from major projects, and donated manuscripts and personal papers. The archives are affiliated with the National Archives and Records Administration.

Geography 

Approximately 96 percent of the land area of Yellowstone National Park is located within the state of Wyoming. Another three percent is within Montana, with the remaining one percent in Idaho. Forests comprise 80 percent of the land area of the park; most of the rest is grassland.

The Continental Divide of North America runs diagonally through the southwestern part of the park. The divide is a topographic feature that separates the Pacific Ocean and Atlantic Ocean water drainages. About one-third of the park lies on the west side of the divide. The origins of the Yellowstone and Snake Rivers are near each other but on opposite sides of the divide. As a result, the waters of the Snake River flow to the Pacific Ocean, while those of the Yellowstone find their way to the Gulf of Mexico.

The highest point in the park is atop Eagle Peak and the lowest is along Reese Creek. Nearby mountain ranges include the Gallatin Range to the northwest, the Beartooth Mountains in the north, the Absaroka Range to the east, the Teton Range to the south, and the Madison Range to the west.

Yellowstone National Park has one of the world's largest petrified forests, trees which were long ago buried by ash and soil and transformed from wood to mineral materials. This ash and other volcanic debris are believed to have come from the park area itself as the central part of Yellowstone is the massive caldera of a supervolcano.

Three deep canyons are located in the park, cut through the volcanic tuff of the Yellowstone Plateau by rivers over the last 640,000 years. The Lewis River flows through Lewis Canyon in the south, and the Yellowstone River has carved two colorful canyons, the Grand Canyon of the Yellowstone and the Black Canyon of the Yellowstone in its journey north.

Geology

Volcanism 

The volcanism of Yellowstone is believed to be linked to the somewhat older volcanism of the Snake River plain. Yellowstone is thus the active part of a hotspot that has moved northeast over time. The origin of this hotspot volcanism is disputed. One theory holds that a mantle plume has caused the Yellowstone hotspot to migrate northeast, while another theory explains migrating hotspot volcanism as the result of the fragmentation and dynamics of the subducted Farallon Plate in Earth's interior.

The Yellowstone Caldera is the largest volcanic system in North America, and worldwide it is only rivaled by the Lake Toba Caldera on Sumatra. It has been termed a "supervolcano" because the caldera was formed by exceptionally large explosive eruptions. The current caldera was created by a cataclysmic eruption that occurred 640,000 years ago, which released more than 240 cubic miles (1,000 km³) of ash, rock and pyroclastic materials. This eruption was more than 1,000 times larger than the 1980 eruption of Mount St. Helens. The most violent known eruption, which occurred 2.1 million years ago, ejected 588 cubic miles (2,450 km³) of volcanic material and created the rock formation known as the Huckleberry Ridge Tuff and created the Island Park Caldera. A smaller eruption ejected 67 cubic miles (280 km³) of material 1.3 million years ago, forming the Henry's Fork Caldera and depositing the Mesa Falls Tuff.

Each of the three climactic eruptions released vast amounts of ash that blanketed much of central North America, falling many hundreds of miles away. The amount of ash and gases released into the atmosphere probably caused significant impacts on world weather patterns and led to the extinction of some species, primarily in North America.

A subsequent caldera-forming eruption occurred about 160,000 years ago. It formed the relatively small caldera that contains the West Thumb of Yellowstone Lake. Since the last supereruption, a series of smaller eruptive cycles between 640,000 and 70,000 years ago, has nearly filled in the Yellowstone Caldera with 80 different eruptions of rhyolitic lavas such as those that can be seen at Obsidian Cliffs and basaltic lavas which can be viewed at Sheepeater Cliff. Lava strata are most easily seen at the Grand Canyon of the Yellowstone, where the Yellowstone River continues to carve into the ancient lava flows. The canyon is a classic V-shaped valley, indicative of river-type erosion rather than erosion caused by glaciation.

Each eruption is part of an eruptive cycle that climaxes with the partial collapse of the roof of the volcano's partially emptied magma chamber. This creates a collapsed depression, called a caldera, and releases vast amounts of volcanic material, usually through fissures that ring the caldera. The time between the last three cataclysmic eruptions in the Yellowstone area has ranged from 600,000 to 800,000 years, but the small number of such climactic eruptions cannot be used to make an accurate prediction for future volcanic events.

Geysers and the hydrothermal system

The most famous geyser in the park, and perhaps the world, is Old Faithful geyser, located in Upper Geyser Basin. Castle Geyser, Lion Geyser, Beehive Geyser, Grand Geyser (the world's tallest predictable geyser), Giant Geyser (the world's most voluminous geyser), Riverside Geyser and numerous other geysers are in the same basin. The park contains the tallest active geyser in the world—Steamboat Geyser in the Norris Geyser Basin. A study that was completed in 2011 found that at least 1283 geysers have erupted in Yellowstone. Of these, an average of 465 are active in a given year. Yellowstone contains at least 10,000 thermal features altogether, including geysers, hot springs, mudpots, and fumaroles. Over half of the world's geysers and hydrothermal features are concentrated in Yellowstone.

In May 2001, the U.S. Geological Survey, Yellowstone National Park, and the University of Utah created the Yellowstone Volcano Observatory (YVO), a partnership for long-term monitoring of the geological processes of the Yellowstone Plateau volcanic field, for disseminating information concerning the potential hazards of this geologically active region.

In 2003, changes at the Norris Geyser Basin resulted in the temporary closure of some trails in the basin. New fumaroles were observed, and several geysers showed enhanced activity and increasing water temperatures. Several geysers became so hot that they were transformed into purely steaming features; the water had become superheated and they could no longer erupt normally. This coincided with the release of reports of a multiple year United States Geological Survey research project which mapped the bottom of Yellowstone Lake and identified a structural dome that had uplifted at some time in the past. Research indicated that these uplifts posed no immediate threat of a volcanic eruption, since they may have developed long ago, and there had been no temperature increase found near the uplifts. On March 10, 2004, a biologist discovered 5 dead bison which apparently had inhaled toxic geothermal gases trapped in the Norris Geyser Basin by a seasonal atmospheric inversion. This was closely followed by an upsurge in earthquake activity in April 2004. As of late 2007, the uplift has continued at a reduced rate. These events inspired a great deal of media attention and speculation about the geologic future of the region. Experts responded to the conjecture by informing the public that there was no increased risk of a volcanic eruption in the near future. However, these changes demonstrate the dynamic nature of the Yellowstone hydrothermal system.

Earthquakes 

Yellowstone experiences thousands of small earthquakes every year, virtually all of which are undetectable to people. There have been six earthquakes with at least magnitude 6 or greater in historical times, including the 7.2‑magnitude Hebgen Lake earthquake which occurred just outside the northwest boundary of the park in 1959. This quake triggered a huge landslide, which caused a partial dam collapse on Hebgen Lake; immediately downstream, the sediment from the landslide dammed the river and created a new lake, known as Earthquake Lake. Twenty-eight people were killed, and property damage was extensive in the immediate region. The earthquake caused some geysers in the northwestern section of the park to erupt, large cracks in the ground formed and emitted steam, and some hot springs that normally have clear water turned muddy. A 6.1‑magnitude earthquake struck inside the park on June 30, 1975, but the damage was minimal.

For three months in 1985, 3,000 minor earthquakes were detected in the northwestern section of the park, during what has been referred to as an earthquake swarm, and has been attributed to minor subsidence of the Yellowstone caldera. Beginning on April 30, 2007, 16 small earthquakes with magnitudes up to 2.7 occurred in the Yellowstone Caldera for several days. These swarms of earthquakes are common, and there have been 70 such swarms between 1983 and 2008. In December 2008, over 250 earthquakes were measured over four days under Yellowstone Lake, the largest measuring a magnitude of 3.9. In January 2010, more than 250 earthquakes were detected over two days. Seismic activity in Yellowstone National Park continues and is reported hourly by the Earthquake Hazards Program of the U.S. Geological Survey.

On March 30, 2014, a magnitude 4.8 earthquake struck almost the very middle of Yellowstone near the Norris Basin at 6:34 am; reports indicated no damage. This was the largest earthquake to hit the park since February 22, 1980.

Biology and ecology 

Yellowstone National Park is the centerpiece of the  Greater Yellowstone Ecosystem, a region that includes Grand Teton National Park, adjacent National Forests and expansive wilderness areas in those forests. The ecosystem is the largest remaining continuous stretch of mostly undeveloped pristine land in the contiguous United States, considered the world's largest intact ecosystem in the northern temperate zone. With the successful wolf reintroduction program, which began in the 1990s, virtually all the original faunal species known to inhabit the region when white explorers first entered the area can be found there.

Flora 
Over 69000 species of trees and other vascular plants are native to the park. Another 170 species are considered to be exotic species and are non-native. Of the eight conifer tree species documented, Lodgepole Pine forests cover 80% of the total forested areas. Other conifers, such as Subalpine Fir, Engelmann Spruce, Rocky Mountain Douglas-fir and Whitebark Pine, are found in scattered groves throughout the park. As of 2007, the whitebark pine is threatened by a fungus known as white pine blister rust; however, this is mostly confined to forests well to the north and west. In Yellowstone, about seven percent of the whitebark pine species have been impacted with the fungus, compared to nearly complete infestations in northwestern Montana. Quaking Aspen and willows are the most common species of deciduous trees. The aspen forests have declined significantly since the early 20th century, but scientists at Oregon State University attribute the recent recovery of the aspen to the reintroduction of wolves which has changed the grazing habits of local elk.

There are dozens of species of flowering plants that have been identified, most of which bloom between May and September. The Yellowstone sand verbena is a rare flowering plant found only in Yellowstone. It is closely related to species usually found in much warmer climates, making the sand verbena an enigma. The estimated 8,000 examples of this rare flowering plant all make their home in the sandy soils on the shores of Yellowstone Lake, well above the waterline.

In Yellowstone's hot waters, bacteria form mats of bizarre shapes consisting of trillions of individuals. These bacteria are some of the most primitive life forms on earth. Flies and other arthropods live on the mats, even in the middle of the bitterly cold winters. Initially, scientists thought that microbes there gained sustenance only from sulfur. In 2005 researchers from the University of Colorado at Boulder discovered that the sustenance for at least some of the diverse hyperthermophilic species is molecular hydrogen.

Thermus aquaticus is a bacterium found in the Yellowstone hot springs that produces an important enzyme (Taq polymerase) that is easily replicated in the lab and is useful in replicating DNA as part of the polymerase chain reaction (PCR) process. The retrieval of these bacteria can be achieved with no impact on the ecosystem. Other bacteria in the Yellowstone hot springs may also prove useful to scientists who are searching for cures for various diseases. In 2016, researchers from Uppsala University reported the discovery of a class of thermophiles, Hadesarchaea, in Yellowstone's Culex Basin. These organisms are capable of converting carbon monoxide and water to carbon dioxide and hydrogen.

Non-native plants sometimes threaten native species by using up nutrient resources. Though exotic species are most commonly found in areas with the greatest human visitation, such as near roads and at major tourist areas, they have also spread into the backcountry. Generally, most exotic species are controlled by pulling the plants out of the soil or by spraying, both of which are time-consuming and expensive.

Fauna 

Yellowstone is widely considered to be the finest megafauna wildlife habitat in the lower 48 states. There are almost 60 species of mammals in the park, including the Rocky Mountain wolf, coyote, the Canadian lynx, cougars, and black and grizzly bears. Other large mammals include the bison (often referred to as buffalo), elk, moose, mule deer, white-tailed deer, mountain goat, pronghorn, and bighorn sheep.

The Yellowstone Park bison herd is the largest public herd of American bison in the United States. Bison once numbered between 30 and 60 million individuals throughout North America, and Yellowstone remains one of their last strongholds. Their populations had increased from less than 50 in the park in 1902 to 4,000 by 2003. The Yellowstone Park bison herd reached a peak in 2005 with 4,900 animals. Despite a summer estimated population of 4,700 in 2007, the number dropped to 3,000 in 2008 after a harsh winter and controversial brucellosis management strategies which sent hundreds to slaughter.

The Yellowstone Park bison herd is believed to be one of only four free-roaming and genetically pure herds on public lands in North America. The other three herds are the Henry Mountains bison herd of Utah, at Wind Cave National Park in South Dakota, and in Elk Island National Park in Alberta.

The relatively large bison populations are a concern for ranchers, who fear that the species can transmit bovine diseases to their domesticated cousins. About half of Yellowstone's bison have been exposed to brucellosis, a bacterial disease that came to North America with European cattle that may cause cattle to miscarry. The disease has little effect on park bison, and no reported cases of transmission from wild bison to domestic livestock have been filed. However, the Animal and Plant Health Inspection Service (APHIS) has stated that bison are the "likely source" of the spread of the disease in cattle in Wyoming and North Dakota. Elk also carry the disease and are believed to have transmitted the infection to horses and cattle.

To combat the perceived threat of brucellosis transmission to cattle, national park personnel regularly corral bison herds back into the park when they venture outside of the area's borders. During the winter of 1996–1997, the bison herd was so large that 1,079 bison that had exited the park were either shot or sent to slaughter. Animal rights activists argue that this is a cruel practice and that the possibility for disease transmission is not as great as some ranchers maintain. Ecologists point out that the bison are merely traveling to seasonal grazing areas that lie within the Greater Yellowstone Ecosystem that have been converted to cattle grazing, some of which are within National Forests and are leased to private ranchers. APHIS has stated that with vaccinations and other means, brucellosis can be eliminated from the bison and elk herds throughout Yellowstone.

Starting in 1914, to protect elk populations, the U.S. Congress appropriated funds to be used for "destroying wolves, prairie dogs, and other animals injurious to agriculture and animal husbandry" on public lands. Park Service hunters carried out these orders, and by 1926 they had killed 136 wolves. Gradually, wolves were virtually eliminated from Yellowstone. Further exterminations continued until the National Park Service ended the practice in 1935. With the passing of the Endangered Species Act in 1973, the wolf was one of the first mammal species listed. After the wolves were extirpated from Yellowstone, the coyote then became the park's top canine predator. Since the coyote is not able to bring down large animals, this lack of an apex predator resulted in a marked increase in lame and sick megafauna.

By the 1990s, the Federal government had reversed its views on wolves. In a controversial decision by the U.S. Fish and Wildlife Service (which oversees threatened and endangered species), northwestern wolves imported from Canada were reintroduced into the park. Reintroduction efforts have been successful, with populations remaining relatively stable. A survey conducted in 2005 reported that there were 13 wolf packs, totaling 118 individuals in Yellowstone and 326 in the entire ecosystem. These park figures were lower than those reported in 2004, but may be attributable to wolf migration to other nearby areas as suggested by the substantial increase in the Montana population during that interval. Almost all the wolves documented were descended from the 66 wolves reintroduced in 1995–96. The recovery of populations throughout the states of Wyoming, Montana, and Idaho has been so successful that on February 27, 2008, the U.S. Fish and Wildlife Service removed the Northern Rocky Mountain wolf population from the endangered species list.

Black bears are common in the park and were a park symbol due to visitor interaction with the bears starting in 1910. Feeding and close contact with bears has not been permitted since the 1960s to reduce their desire for human foods. Yellowstone is one of the few places in the United States where black bears can be seen coexisting with grizzly bears. Black bear observations occur most often in the park's northern ranges, and in the Bechler area which is in the park's southwestern corner.

, an estimated 700 grizzly bears were living in the Greater Yellowstone Ecosystem, with about 150 grizzlies living wholly or partially within Yellowstone National Park. The grizzly was initially listed as a threatened species in the contiguous United States on July 28, 1975, by the Fish and Wildlife Service. The grizzly bear was taken off the endangered species list in 2007. Opponents of delisting the grizzly expressed concerns that states might once again allow hunting and that better conservation measures were needed to ensure a sustainable population. A federal district judge overturned the delisting ruling in 2009, reinstating the grizzly; however, the grizzly was once again removed from the list in 2017. In September 2018, a U.S. district judge ruled that the grizzly's protections must be restored in full, arguing the Fish and Wildlife Service was mistaken in removing the bear from the threatened status list. Regardless of the rulings, hunting is prohibited within Yellowstone National Park. Hunters who legally hunt animals outside park boundaries may transport the carcass through the park with a permit.

Population figures for elk are more than 30,000—the largest population of any large mammal species in Yellowstone. The northern herd has decreased enormously since the mid‑1990s; this has been attributed to wolf predation and causal effects such as elk using more forested regions to evade predation, consequently making it harder for researchers to accurately count them. The northern herd migrates west into southwestern Montana in the winter. The southern herd migrates southward, and the majority of this elk winter on the National Elk Refuge, immediately southeast of Grand Teton National Park. The southern herd migration is the largest mammalian migration remaining in the U.S. outside of Alaska.

Fecal material and other evidence obtained were tested and confirmed to be those of a lynx. No visual confirmation was made, however. Lynx have not been seen in Yellowstone since 1998, though DNA taken from hair samples obtained in 2001 confirmed that lynx were at least transient to the park. Other less commonly seen mammals include the mountain lion and wolverine. The mountain lion has an estimated population of only 25 individuals parkwide. Accurate population figures for the wolverine are not known. These uncommon and rare mammals provide insight into the health of protected lands such as Yellowstone and help managers make determinations as to how best to preserve habitats.

Eighteen species of fish live in Yellowstone, including the core range of the Yellowstone cutthroat trout—a fish highly sought by anglers. The Yellowstone cutthroat trout has faced several threats since the 1980s, including the suspected illegal introduction into Yellowstone Lake of lake trout, an invasive species which consume the smaller cutthroat trout. Although lake trout were established in Shoshone and Lewis lakes (on the Snake River drainage) after U.S. government stocking operations in 1890, it was never officially introduced into the Yellowstone River drainage. The cutthroat trout has also faced an ongoing drought, as well as the accidental introduction of a parasite—whirling disease—which causes a terminal nervous system disease in younger fish. Since 2001, all native sport fish species caught in Yellowstone waterways are subject to catch and release regulations.

Yellowstone is also home to seven species of reptiles, including the painted turtle, rubber Rubber boa, and prairie rattlesnake, bullsnake, sagebrush lizard, valley garter snake and wandering garter snake and four species of amphibians, including the boreal chorus frog, tiger salamander, western toad and columbia spotted frog.

Three hundred eleven species of birds have been reported, almost half of which nest in Yellowstone. In 1999, twenty-six pairs of nesting bald eagle were documented. Extremely rare sightings of whooping cranes have been recorded, however, only three examples of this species are known to live in the Rocky Mountains, out of 385 known worldwide. Other birds, considered to be species of special concern because of their rarity in Yellowstone, include the common loon, harlequin duck, osprey, peregrine falcon and the trumpeter swan.

Forest fires 

As wildfire is a natural part of most ecosystems, plants that are indigenous to Yellowstone have adapted in a variety of ways. Douglas-fir have a thick bark that protects the inner section of the tree from most fires. Lodgepole Pines—the most common tree species in the park—generally have cones that are only opened by the heat of a fire. Their seeds are held in place by a tough resin, and fire assists in melting the resin, allowing the seeds to disperse. Fire clears out dead and downed wood, providing fewer obstacles for lodgepole pines to flourish. Subalpine Fir, Engelmann Spruce, Whitebark Pine, and other species tend to grow in colder and moister areas, where the fire is less likely to occur. Aspen trees sprout new growth from their roots, and even if a severe fire kills the tree above ground, the roots often survive unharmed because they are insulated from the heat by soil. The National Park Service estimates that in natural conditions, grasslands in Yellowstone burned an average of every 20 to 25 years, while forests in the park would experience fire about every 300 years.

About thirty-five natural forest fires are ignited each year by lightning, while another six to ten are started by people—in most cases by accident. Yellowstone National Park has three fire lookout towers, each staffed by trained firefighters. The easiest one to reach is atop Mount Washburn, which has interpretive exhibits and an observation deck open to the public. The park also monitors fire from the air and relies on visitor reports of smoke and/or flames. Fire towers are staffed almost continuously from late June to mid-September—the primary fire season. Fires burn with the greatest intensity in the late afternoon and evening. Fire management focuses on monitoring dead and down wood quantities, soil, and tree moisture, and the weather, to determine those areas most vulnerable to fire should one ignite. The current policy is to suppress all human-caused fires and to evaluate natural fires, examining the benefit or detriment they may pose to the ecosystem. If a fire is considered to be an immediate threat to people and structures, or will burn out of control, then fire suppression is performed.

To minimize the chances of out-of-control fires and threats to people and structures, park employees do more than just monitor the potential for fire. Controlled burns are prescribed fires that are deliberately started to remove dead timber under conditions that allow firefighters an opportunity to carefully control where and how much wood is consumed. Natural fires are sometimes considered prescribed fires if they are left to burn. In Yellowstone, unlike some other parks, there have been very few fires deliberately started by employees as prescribed burns. However, over the last 30 years, over 300 natural fires have been allowed to burn naturally. In addition, firefighters remove dead and down wood and other hazards from areas where they will be a potential fire threat to lives and property, reducing the chances of fire danger in these areas. Fire monitors also regulate fire through educational services to the public and have been known to temporarily ban campfires from campgrounds during periods of high fire danger. The common notion in early United States land management policies was that all forest fires were bad. The fire was seen as a purely destructive force and there was little understanding that it was an integral part of the ecosystem. Consequently, until the 1970s, when a better understanding of wildfire was developed, all fires were suppressed. This led to an increase in dead and dying forests, which would later provide the fuel load for fires that would be much harder, and in some cases, impossible to control. The latest Fire Management Plan (2014) allows natural fires to burn if they posed no immediate threat to lives and property.

The spring season of 1988 was wet, but by summer, drought began moving in throughout the northern Rockies, creating the driest year on record to that point. Grasses and plants which grew well in the early summer from the abundant spring moisture produced plenty of grass, which soon turned to dry tinder. The National Park Service began firefighting efforts to keep the fires under control, but the extreme drought made suppression difficult. By the end of the month, the fires were out of control. Seven large fires were responsible for 95% of the  that were burned over the next couple of months. The cost of 25,000 firefighters and U.S. military forces participating in the suppression efforts was 120 million dollars. By the time winter brought snow that helped extinguish the last flames, the fires had destroyed 67 structures and caused several million dollars in damage. Though no civilians died, two personnel associated with the firefighting efforts were killed.

Contrary to media reports and speculation at the time, the fires killed very few park animals—surveys indicated that only about 345 elk (of an estimated 40,000–50,000), 36 deer, 12 moose, 6 black bears, and 9 bison had perished. Changes in fire management policies were implemented by land management agencies throughout the United States, based on knowledge gained from the 1988 fires and the evaluation of scientists and experts from various fields. By 1992, Yellowstone had adopted a new fire management plan which observed stricter guidelines for the management of natural fires.

Climate and weather 

Yellowstone's climate is greatly influenced by altitude, with lower elevations generally found to be warmer year-round. During the summer months of June to early September, daytime highs are normally in the  range, while nighttime lows can go to below freezing (0 °C), especially at higher altitudes. Summer afternoons are frequently accompanied by thunderstorms. Winter in Yellowstone is accompanied by high temperatures usually between zero and 20 °F (−20 to −5 °C) and nighttime temperatures below 0  °F (−18 °C) for most of the winter.

The precipitation of Yellowstone is greatly influenced by the moisture channel formed by the Snake River Plain to the west that was, in turn, formed by Yellowstone itself. Snow is possible in any month of the year, but most common between November and April, with averages of  annually around Yellowstone Lake, to twice that amount at higher elevations.

The climate at Yellowstone Lake is classified as subarctic (Dfc), according to Köppen-Geiger climate classification, while at the park headquarters, the classification is humid continental (Dfb).

Tornadoes in Yellowstone are rare; however, on July 21, 1987, the most powerful tornado recorded in Wyoming touched down in the Teton Wilderness of Bridger-Teton National Forest and hit Yellowstone National Park.

In June 2022, the park closed entrances and evacuated visitors after experiencing record-level rainfall and flooding that caused multiple road and bridge failures, power outages, and mudslides. Damage from the flooding includes washed out roads and bridges, and damage to infrastructure systems including electricity, water and wastewater systems. It's unlikely that the park will be able to reopen the north entrance by Gardiner, MT, or the northeast entrance near Cooke City, MT, during the 2022 season. The park partially reopened Wednesday, June 22, after a 9-day closure. To limit the nearly one million visitors per month that visit in the summer, the park has restricted entry to cars based on license plates. Cars with license plates ending in even numbers can enter on even-numbered dates, and plates ending in odd numbers can enter on odd-numbered dates.

Recreation 

Yellowstone ranks among the most popular national parks in the United States. Since the mid-1960s, at least 2 million tourists have visited the park almost every year. Average annual visitation increased to 3.5 million during the ten years from 2007 to 2016, with a record of 4,257,177 recreational visitors in 2016. July is the busiest month for Yellowstone National Park. At peak summer levels, 3,700 employees work for Yellowstone National Park concessionaires. Concessionaires manage nine hotels and lodges, with a total of 2,238 hotel rooms and cabins available. They also oversee gas stations, stores, and most of the campgrounds. Another 800 employees work either permanently or seasonally for the National Park Service.

Park service roads lead to major features; however, road reconstruction has produced temporary road closures. Yellowstone is in the midst of a long-term road reconstruction effort, which is hampered by a short repair season. In the winter, all roads aside from the one which enters from Gardiner, Montana, and extends to Cooke City, Montana, are closed to wheeled vehicles. Park roads are closed to wheeled vehicles from early November to mid-April, but some park roads remain closed until mid-May. The park has  of paved roads which can be accessed from five different entrances. There is no public transportation available inside the park, but several tour companies can be contacted for guided (including self-guided) motorized transport. In the winter, concessionaires operate guided snowmobile and snow coach tours, though their numbers and access are based on quotas established by the National Park Service. Facilities in the Old Faithful, Canyon and Mammoth Hot Springs areas of the park are very busy during the summer months. Traffic jams created by road construction or by people observing wildlife can result in long delays.

The National Park Service maintains nine visitor centers and museums and is responsible for the maintenance of historical structures and many of the other 2,000 buildings. These structures include National Historical Landmarks such as the Old Faithful Inn built from 1903 to 1904 and the entire Fort Yellowstone – Mammoth Hot Springs Historic District. A historical and educational tour is available at Fort Yellowstone which details the history of the National Park Service and the development of the park. Campfire programs, guided walks, and other interpretive presentations normally available at numerous locations in the summer, and on a limited basis during other seasons were suspended in 2021 as a COVID-19 response.

Camping is available at a dozen campgrounds with more than 2,000 campsites. Camping is also available in surrounding National Forests, as well as in Grand Teton National Park to the south. Backcountry campsites are accessible only by foot or by horseback and require a permit. The park is not considered to be a good destination for mountaineering because of the instability of volcanic rock which predominates. Visitors with pets are required to keep them on a leash at all times and are limited to areas near roadways and in "front country" zones such as drive-in campgrounds. Around thermal features, wooden and paved trails have been constructed to ensure visitor safety, and most of these areas are handicapped accessible. The National Park Service maintains a year-round clinic at Mammoth Hot Springs and provides emergency services throughout the year.

Hunting is not permitted, though it is allowed in the surrounding national forests during the open season. Fishing is a popular activity, and a Yellowstone Park fishing license is required to fish in park waters. Many park waters are fly fishing only and all native fish species are catch and release only. Boating is prohibited on rivers and creeks except for a  stretch of the Lewis River between Lewis and Shoshone lakes, and it is open to non-motorized use only. Yellowstone Lake has a marina at Bridge Bay while there is a boat ramp at the Lewis lake campground.

In the early history of the park, visitors were allowed, and sometimes even encouraged, to feed the bears. Visitors welcomed the chance to get their pictures taken with the bears, who had learned to beg for food. This led to numerous injuries to humans each year. In 1970, park officials changed their policy and started a vigorous program to educate the public on the dangers of close contact with bears, and to try to eliminate opportunities for bears to find food in campgrounds and trash collection areas. Although it has become more difficult to observe bears in recent years, the number of human injuries and deaths has taken a significant drop and visitors are in less danger. The eighth recorded bear-related death in the park's history occurred in August 2015.

Other protected lands in the region include Caribou-Targhee, Gallatin, Custer, Shoshone and Bridger-Teton National Forests. The National Park Service's John D. Rockefeller, Jr. Memorial Parkway is to the south and leads to Grand Teton National Park. The famed Beartooth Highway provides access from the northeast and has spectacular high-altitude scenery. Nearby communities include West Yellowstone, Montana; Cody, Wyoming; Red Lodge, Montana; Ashton, Idaho; and Gardiner, Montana. The closest air transport is available by way of Bozeman, Montana; Billings, Montana; Jackson; Cody, Wyoming, or Idaho Falls, Idaho. Salt Lake City,  to the south, is the closest large metropolitan area.

Legal jurisdiction

The entire park is within the jurisdiction of the United States District Court for the District of Wyoming, making it the only federal court district that includes portions of more than one state (Idaho, Montana, and Wyoming). Law professor Brian C. Kalt has argued that it may be impossible to impanel a jury in compliance with the Vicinage Clause of the Sixth Amendment for a crime committed solely in the unpopulated Idaho portion of the park (and that it would be difficult to do so for a crime committed solely in the lightly populated Montana portion). One defendant, who was accused of a wildlife-related crime in the Montana portion of the park, attempted to raise this argument but eventually pleaded guilty, with the plea deal including his specific agreement not to raise the issue in his appeal.

See also 

 Bibliography of Yellowstone National Park
 List of national parks of the United States
 Making North America (2015 PBS film)
 National Parks in Idaho
 Outline of Yellowstone National Park

References

Further reading
 Whittlesey, Lee H. (2002), "Native Americans, the Earliest Interpreters: What is Known About Their Legends and Stories of Yellowstone National Park and the Complexities of Interpreting Them", The George Wright Forum, published by the George Wright Society, Vol. 19, No. 3, pp. 40–51. .

External links 

  of the National Park Service
 Travertine: Yellowstone’s Hydrothermal Timekeeper USGS May 24, 2021
 Act Establishing Yellowstone National Park from the Library of Congress
 Congressional Acts Pertaining to Yellowstone
 The Yellowstone magmatic system from the mantle plume to the upper crust at Science (registration required)
 BYU Larsen Yellowstone collection at the L. Tom Perry Special Collections Library of Brigham Young University
 Yellowstone articles, photos and videos at National Geographic
 Photographic library of the U.S. Geological Survey (archive)
 
 
 
 Historic American Engineering Record (HAER) documentation:
 
 
 

 
1872 establishments in Idaho Territory
1872 establishments in Montana Territory
1872 establishments in Wyoming Territory
1872 establishments in the United States
Biosphere reserves of the United States
Civilian Conservation Corps in Idaho
Civilian Conservation Corps in Montana
Civilian Conservation Corps in Wyoming
Geysers of Wyoming
Greater Yellowstone Ecosystem
Historic American Engineering Record in Montana
History of the Rocky Mountains
History of Wyoming
Hot springs of Wyoming
Hot springs of Teton County, Wyoming
Landforms of Park County, Wyoming
Landforms of Teton County, Wyoming
National parks in Idaho
National parks in Montana
National parks in Wyoming
National parks of the Rocky Mountains
Protected areas established in 1872
Protected areas of Fremont County, Idaho
Protected areas of Gallatin County, Montana
Protected areas of Park County, Montana
Protected areas of Park County, Wyoming
Protected areas of Teton County, Wyoming
Regions of Wyoming
World Heritage Sites in the United States
Yellowstone Caldera